Delaware Township is one of the seventeen townships of Hancock County, Ohio, United States. As of the 2010 census the population was 1,285, of whom 793 lived in the unincorporated portion of the township.

Geography
Located in the southeastern corner of the county, it borders the following townships:
Amanda Township - northeast
Richland Township, Wyandot County - east
Jackson Township, Hardin County - south
Blanchard Township, Hardin County - southwest
Madison Township - west
Jackson Township - northwest

The village of Mount Blanchard is located in northern Delaware Township.

Name and history
Statewide, other Delaware Townships are located in Defiance and Delaware counties.

Government
The township is governed by a three-member board of trustees, who are elected in November of odd-numbered years to a four-year term beginning on the following January 1. Two are elected in the year after the presidential election and one is elected in the year before it. There is also an elected township fiscal officer, who serves a four-year term beginning on April 1 of the year after the election, which is held in November of the year before the presidential election. Vacancies in the fiscal officership or on the board of trustees are filled by the remaining trustees.

References

External links

Townships in Hancock County, Ohio
Townships in Ohio